Human rights in Lithuania have been the subject of much coverage. Lithuania scores 91 out of 100 in 2019 report by Freedom House, which classifies the country as "free", with high rankings in civil liberties and political rights. In particular, Lithuania ranks 30th among 180 countries, well above the world's average level in press freedom, and achieves a full score in freedom of assembly and nongovernmental organisations. However, there are concerns regarding children's welfare, domestic violence, discrimination against minorities including the Roma, Jews and LGBTI people, as well as inhumane treatments of prisoners. The Constitution of Lithuania guarantees the protection of human rights.
 
However, in recent years the government started to restrict the media from criticizing politicians and requires the journalists to pay a fee for the information from government systems. These actions are regarded as a violation of freedom of expression and have been protested by the public. The Human Rights Monitoring Institute recommended that Lithuania "refer to their northern neighbors and invest more in protecting citizens, especially women's and children's human rights", which are poorly fared and needs to be improved.

Legal framework 
Lithuania has a Roman inspired legal system. The Constitution of the Republic of Lithuania, adopted in 1992 by referendum after Lithuania restored its democratic and independent statehood from Soviet in 1990, enforced the foundation of social system and standardized the rights, freedoms and duties of citizens. The Constitution has been amended several times, with the latest amendment made in 2016.

Chapter II of the Constitution, containing Articles 18 to 37, is titled "The Human Being And The State". This chapter is the most relevant to the protection of human rights.

Civil Liberties

Freedom of expression 
In Article 25 of the Constitution of Lithuania, people's rights of free conviction and expression are stated as "No one should be hindered from seeking, acquiring or disseminating information and ideas." Freedom of speech and the press are generally respected by the Lithuanian government.

Freedom of the press 

According to RWB's 2019 World Press Freedom Index, Lithuania ranks 30th among 180 countries in the world. Although the Constitution guarantees the freedom of the press, and the media in Lithuania enjoyed plenary freedom for the last 3 decades, the government focused on furthering control over it. There have been several suspensions of Russian language broadcasting cases in Lithuania for either three months or six months, which were due to warmongering and inciting discord and disseminating of propaganda. On 11 January 2018, the day before the anniversary of the 1991 independence fight, in which 14 people died and hundreds were injured, the major part in parliament, which was led by the populist Greens and party of Farmer Union took actions to ban public from discoursing critical information in order to protect the country from being distrusted and distorted.

However, these proposed measures are regarded as undermining freedom of media and limitation of media pluralism may violate freedom of expression. In the case of potential suspension of Russian language broadcast of two TV channels, a press freedom coalition groups wrote a letter to the president of Lithuania to argue the ban is counterproductive and contradicts with Article 19 of the Universal Declaration of Human Rights and other international free speech standards even though they understand the protest is in "the current tense situation". The group also added that a large public in Moscow is rational to news reports and arguments and the government should not take the risk to cut off the outside free flow of information for such audiences.

In response to the violation of press freedom, on 12 October 2018, Lithuania President Dalia Grybauskaitė held a meeting that discussed media freedom issues with ENEX members, and the President showed determination to defend freedom of the media.

Freedom of the speech 
According to the Human Rights Monitoring Institute, in mid-September 2018, the Lithuanian Centre of Registers considered to stop providing free information to officially requesting journalists since the practice was not included in the law and therefore the journalists should pay for the information at the standard commercial rates. This action was appealed by the journalist to the authorities publicly, emphasizing that it was a serious violation of the rights to get access to free information.

Freedom of the Internet 
In Lithuania, access to Internet for citizens is not restricted by the government. According to the European Court of Human Rights, prisoners in Lithuania should not be restricted access to internet featuring study and learning programs,  as they found that Lithuania barred a prisoner from applying to an online law course, which violated Article 10 of the convention.

Freedom of assembly 

Article 36 of the Constitution of the Republic of Lithuania states the rights for citizens to assemble unarmed in peaceful meetings. The law on meetings of the Republic of Lithuania is set to guarantee the constitutional rights of the citizens about assemble and the procedure for protecting national security and public safety.  Based on the statistic of Freedom House, before 2018 freedom of assembly in Lithuania was stated as generally observed, while in 2018 and 2019 it improved to be as generally respected.

In respect of Lithuania lesbian, gay, bisexual and transgender (LGBT) persons, Amnesty International urges Lithuanian authorities to provide them opportunities to hold tolerance events and give enough police protection during the events. In 2010, the first Pride march for LGBT persons was allowed by Lithuania's supreme administrative court to be held in Vilnius. In 2013, the mayor of Vilnius attempted to forcefully relocate the Pride march from the central avenue to a remote street outside the city center, but was unsuccessful due to the protection from two courts. The Baltic Pride took place in Vilnius and marched on the main avenue and went without any major incidents. The Baltic Pride held on 18 June, 2016 in Vilnius was a success, with no institutional obstacles or tedious legal battles compared to the last two. A crowd of 3,000 LGBT community members and their allies joined the March for Equality in memory of the victims of the Orlando attack. The mayor of Vilnius did not attend, but did send compliments to the event. There were no serious incidents, but a member of the Parliament attacked the procession and had to be dragged by the police.

Freedom of religion 

Religious freedom is guaranteed by Lithuanian Constitution in Article 26 and other laws. The criminal code includes three provisions to protect freedom of religion. It prohibits religious discrimination and provides for up to 2 years in prison for violations. Article 43 of the Constitution defines the relationship between religion and the State. The law divides registered religious groups into state-recognized traditional religious groups, other state-recognized religious groups, and all other registered communities and associations. The religious communities are divided into traditional and other.

In 2009 Report on International Religious Freedom, it is stated that there are nine "traditional" religious groups listed by law that can trace their presence in the country back at least 300 years: Latin Rite Catholics (Roman Catholics), Evangelical Lutherans, Evangelical Reformed Churchgoers, Greek Rite Catholics，Orthodox Christians (Moscow Patriarchate), Old Believers, Jews, "Sunni Muslims" and Karaites. These traditional religious groups can enjoy many government benefits, including receive annual government subsidies that other groups are not granted to. Other state-recognized religious groups involve those who officially registered in the country for at least 25 years, have societal support from at least 15 adult citizens and have instructions that are in accord with laws and morality. Nontraditional groups can have the support from public funds for cultural and social projects.

In 2017, a TV show in Lithuania is closed because one of the judges, actress and former lawmaker gave a Nazi salute while contestants sang a song that was made popular by a Jewish singer. Comments about anti-Semitic and anti-Muslim on the Internet were common.

Personal data protection 
The Lithuanian parliament passed the new law on personal data protection on 30 June 2018 and the law came into effect on 16 July 2018. The regulation of general data protection is about the protection of personal data both for consumers and companies/institutions, which provides more possibilities for consumers to control their data.

Rights to private and family life 
According to Equality and Human Rights Commission, in 2002 the European Court of Human Rights (ECHR) ruled the rights of marriage between men and women contained in Article 12 were to be extended to transsexual people. In Article 8, titled "Respect for your private and family life", it is demonstrated that private life is a very broad concept; it calls for citizens to be free to understand and determine one's sexual orientation and personal identity, (and identify as one chooses appropriate),  while family life calls for the rights to a family living in peace, without interference by the public or government, and can include the relationship between an unmarried couple.

As stated in Article 38 of the Constitution, "Marriage shall be concluded upon the free mutual consent of man and woman." Lithuania fails to comply with human rights standards, due to there being no legal acknowledgment of  non-married families. In 2017, the Lithuanian parliament (Seimas) completely rejected proposed legislation of same-sex partnerships. Lithuanians are one of only a few remaining EU countries with no form of legal recognition for same-sex couples; this includes Bulgaria, Latvia, Poland, Romania and Slovakia. Civil partnerships between people of both same and different genders are still unlikely to be established in Lithuania.

Human reproductive rights in Lithuania have not received much in the way of  acknowledgment from public and governmental authorities, while faith-based organisations hamper the progress of the implementation of reproductive rights. In 2013, a drafted law, aimed at limiting access to safe and legal abortions, was presented to the national Parliament for assessment. Although this law would pose a real threat to women's health and lives  (plus its violation of human rights), its authors and supporters continued to push  to have it passed; this became a general concern and was protested by Human Rights Monitoring Institute (HRMI) .

In the case of L. v. Lithuania (in 2007), L. is a transsexual Lithuanian citizen who faces challenges in their daily life, due to the country failing to adopt a legal act outlining the conditions and procedures of gender reassignment. The European Court of Human Rights (ECHR) found that Lithuania had violated rights to private and family life, and ordered Lithuania to adopt the necessary legislation on gender reassignment within three months of the ruling. Lithuania paid the damages to the applicant, but did not adopt the required legislation in time. HRMI and the Lithuanian Gay League continued to advocate for full implementation of the Court's ruling. In 2011, the Court ordered the civil registry office to change L.'s birth certificate records, and the Residents’ Register Service to change their ID number.

In 2018, Lithuanian Prime Minister Saulius Skvernelis employed an LGBT rights rally in Vilnius to solicit the Lithuanian parliament to pass legislation for registered same-sex couples.

Concerns

Children's welfare 
In the law on Protection against Domestic Violence, children's protection against violence is regulated. However, in the 2016 Country Reports on Human Rights Practices, it is stated that one of the most serious human rights issues in Lithuania is children's welfare. According to Lithuanian Children's Rights Ombudsman Institution, violence against children comes from both families and public institutions. Also, bullying among children themselves is a big problem. Parental overuse of alcohol is the main reason of child abuse.

Domestic violence against women 
In 2011, Lithuania passed the Law on Protection against Domestic Violence. According to the survey results of 2014 European Union Agency for Fundamental Rights, in Lithuania 1 in 3 (31%) of women ages above 15 have experienced physical and/or sexual violence, which is quite close to EU's overall level (33%). Domestic violence victims (women) are usually the one get blamed, which prevents women from asking or receiving real help. In 2017 4 out of 5 victims in the domestic violence cases (48000 registered) are women.

Abuses against refugees and migrants 

The Amnesty International reported that Lithuanian authorities have arbitrarily detained thousands of refugees and migrants in prison-like centers, where they have been subjected to inhumane conditions, torture and other ill-treatment. Many people reported being beaten, insulted and subjected to racially-motivated intimidation and harassment by guards. Dozens of people from countries including Cameroon, the Democratic Republic of Congo, Iraq, Nigeria, Syria and Sri Lanka were unlawfully detained, while Lithuania has rightly extended a warm welcome to tens of thousands of people fleeing Russia-Ukraine war.

References